Nicolas Estgen (28 February 1930 – 26 December 2019) was a Luxembourgish politician for the Christian Social People's Party and head teacher.  He sat in the European Parliament from 1979 until 1994.

References

1930 births
2019 deaths
Members of the Chamber of Deputies (Luxembourg)
Christian Social People's Party politicians
Luxembourgian educators
People from Dudelange
Christian Social People's Party MEPs
MEPs for Luxembourg 1979–1984
MEPs for Luxembourg 1984–1989
MEPs for Luxembourg 1989–1994